Stories from the Surface is the third album from Irish rock band Ham Sandwich. It was released in Ireland on 17 April 2015, and was produced by the band's long-time collaborator Karl Odlum. "Illuminate" was the band's first single to chart in Ireland, reaching 43 in the Irish music charts. The album has received mostly positive reviews in the band's native Ireland and went straight to first place in the Irish charts on its first week of release, becoming the band's first album to reach the top 20.

Track listing

Sources:

Personnel
Ham Sandwich
Podge McNamee - lead vocals, guitar
Niamh Farrell - lead vocals
Brian Darcy - guitar
David McEnroe - bass
Ollie Murphy - drums

Additional musicians
Sarah Lynch, Pat Daly, Kim Porcelli - strings
Donagh Molloy - brass

Production
Karl Odlum - production
Greg Calbi - mastering
Danny Kalb - mixing
Alan Clarke, Steve Averill - album artwork

Charts

References

2015 albums
Ham Sandwich (band) albums